The African Queen is a 1935 novel written by English author C. S. Forester. It was adapted into the 1951 film of the  same name.

Plot summary
The story opens in August/September 1914. Rose Sayer, a 33-year-old British woman, is the companion and housekeeper of her brother Samuel Sayer, an Anglican missionary in German East Africa (present-day Tanzania). World War I has recently begun, and the German military commander of the area has conscripted all the natives; the village is deserted, and only Rose and her brother, who is dying, remain. Samuel dies during the night and Rose is alone. That day a London Cockney named Allnutt arrives at the village. Allnutt is the mechanic and skipper of the African Queen, a steam-powered launch, owned by a Belgian mining corporation, that plies the upper reaches of the Ulanga River. Allnutt's two-man crew has deserted him because of the rumours of war and conscription. Allnutt buries Rose's brother and brings Rose to the African Queen, where they consider what they should do.

The African Queen is well-stocked with tinned food, and carries a two-hundredweight cargo of blasting gelignite. It also holds two large tanks of oxygen and hydrogen. Rose is inflamed with patriotism, and also filled with the desire to avenge insults that the Germans had piled on her brother. It occurs to her that the main German defence against a British attack by water in the area is a gunboat, Königin Luise, which guards the fictional Lake Wittelsbach into which the Ulanga feeds. She asks Allnutt if he can make the gelignite into a makeshift torpedo. Allnutt replies that that is not possible, but after some thought, he concludes that by loading the gelignite inside the emptied tanks, putting the tanks into the bow of the launch, and rigging a detonator, they could turn the African Queen itself into a sort of large torpedo. Allnutt is inclined to laugh off the idea, but he gives in to Rose's greater strength of will and the two of them set off down the Ulanga, Rose steering and Allnutt maintaining the launch's ancient, balky, wood-burning steam engine.

The descent to the lake poses three main problems: passing the German-held town of Shona; navigating some heavy rapids and cataracts; and getting through the river delta. After many days on the river, they come close to Shona, and Allnutt's nerve fails. He refuses to take the launch under fire, anchors in a backwater, and gets drunk on gin. Unable to work the launch single-handedly, Rose sets out to make Allnutt's life miserable until he agrees to her plan. While he is asleep she pours all his gin overboard, then refuses to speak to him. The weak-willed Allnutt eventually gives in, and the African Queen gets underway again. They come in sight of Shona at midday. The German commander assumes that the launch is coming in to surrender (because he believes no boat could pass the rapids downriver from the town, so Shona is the only possible destination). He does not realise his mistake until it is too late, and though he and his men open fire, the launch sustains only minor damage as it passes the town.

Once it is below the town, the African Queen spends several days shooting the rapids; Allnutt is exhilarated, and he and Rose are reconciled and become lovers. Rose, embarrassed, admits that she does not know Allnutt's first name; he tells her it is Charlie. On the third day the launch strikes on rocks while navigating some rapids, goes off course and does not respond well to the tiller, so they are forced to anchor on the lee side of a rock outcropping. Allnutt dives into the water to inspect the underside of the launch and finds that the driveshaft is bent and the propeller has lost one of its blades. Over the next weeks they slowly repair the damage without being able to beach the launch; Allnutt has to dive repeatedly to remove the shaft and propeller. On shore they gather wood and construct a makeshift bellows to heat the shaft so Allnutt can straighten it. Then Allnutt makes a new propeller blade out of scrap iron and bolts it to the stump of the old blade. After numerous dives to fix the shaft and propeller, they continue on their way and eventually pass the rapids, coming out of the Ulanga River into the larger Bora River, which feeds into the lake. By this point, Rose has become an expert at using the tiller and reading the complex changes of the river.

Passing the river delta is long and arduous. Tormented by myriads of biting insects, sickened by malaria, and wracked by the terrible heat and powerful thunderstorms, they drag the launch through miles of reeds and water-grass with their boat-hooks, occasionally diving to cut fallen logs out of their way. Though the launch is shallow (with a draft of only thirty inches), it constantly runs aground on the thick mud. Finally, after weeks of exhausting labour, they emerge into the lake. 

They hide the launch in a stand of reeds and begin constructing the torpedo. Allnutt releases the gas from his two tanks and unscrews the valves, leaving a hole big enough for him to fill the tanks with gelignite, packed in mud. He cuts two holes in the front of the launch, right at the waterline, and fixes the two tanks there; he then constructs detonators from nails and revolver cartridges, so the gelignite will detonate on impact. All that is left is to pilot the launch right into the side of the Königin Luise, and the resulting explosion will destroy both vessels. They have been keeping track of the gunboat's habits, and choose a night when it will be anchored close to them. They argue about which of them should pilot the launch and which should stay behind, but in the end they agree that they will both go. They fire up the engine and set out on the attack, but halfway to their target a sudden storm sweeps up out of nowhere and overwhelms them; the African Queen sinks, and Rose and Allnutt have to swim for safety.

The two lovers are separated in the storm, but both are captured by the Germans the next day. They are brought before the captain of the Königin Luise to be tried as spies. Both refuse to say how they came to the lake, but the captain sees "African Queen" written on Rose's life-saver and deduces that they must be the mechanic and the missionary's sister from the mysteriously missing launch. He decides it would be uncivilised to execute them, so he flies a flag of truce and delivers them to the British naval commander, who dismissively sends them to separate tents under guard while he takes his newly arrived reinforcements out to sink the Königin Luise. Having succeeded in this, he sends Rose and Allnutt to the coast to speak to the British Consul, where he advises Allnutt to enlist in the British Army. Rose and Allnutt agree that when they reach the coast they will ask the Consul to marry them. The story ends with the narrator's comment that "Whether or not they lived happily ever after is not easily decided."

The MV Liemba, named SMS Graf von Goetzen during World War I, was the inspiration for the German gunboat.

Film adaptations
The novel was made into a film in 1951: The African Queen, starring Humphrey Bogart as Charlie Allnutt and Katharine Hepburn as Rose Sayer. Allnutt is changed to a Canadian in the film to explain Bogart's accent. The church is changed to Methodist from Anglican - though the paper which Allnut delivers to the missionaries in the first scene records the elevation of a college friend of the missionaries to being a bishop, which makes no sense given that the Methodist Church of Great Britain has no bishops.  There are significant changes to the plot after the sinking of the African Queen.

In 1977, a one-hour made for television film called The African Queen aired on CBS. Intended as a pilot for a television series following the further adventures of the Alnutts, it stars Warren Oates as Charlie and Mariette Hartley as Rose.

References

External links
 

Fiction set in 1914
1935 British novels
British novels adapted into films
Little, Brown and Company books
Novels by C. S. Forester
Novels set in colonial Africa
Novels set in Tanzania
Novels set during World War I